Anne Catherine Dangeville (née Desmares; c.1685 - 1 July 1772) was a French stage actor.   She was also known under her stage names Mlle Dangeville mère, Mlle Dangeville cadette or Mme Antoine.

Life
She was the daughter of Nicolas Desmares and Anne d'Ennebault - her father's sister was Marie Champmeslé, whilst her own elder sister was Charlotte Desmares. She made her début on 23 December 1707 as Pauline in Polyeucte with the Comédie-Française company, which received her as a full member on 5 January 1708 by order of the court. She retired with a pension on 21 December 1712.

She married Antoine-François Botot Dangeville, a dancing master and member of the Académie royale de danse. They had several children, including the actors Étienne, François and Marie-Anne Botot.

References 

Sociétaires of the Comédie-Française
1772 deaths
1685 births
18th-century French actresses
French stage actresses